Bain's Cape Mountain is a South African brand of whisky distilled at the James Sedgwick distillery in Wellington, Western Cape (Drakenstein Local Municipality). Launched in 2009, Bain's is South Africa's first whisky produced from a single grain, being made from 100% yellow maize (corn). Bain's is owned by Distell, a multinational brewing and beverage company based in Stellenbosch, South Africa. Bain's is named after Andrew Geddes Bain, who built the Bainskloof Pass that connects the town of Wellington, where the distillery is located, to the interior of the country in 1853.

Andy Watts is currently the Master Distiller, only the 6th since the distillery was established in 1886.
Bain's was named the World’s Best Grain Whisky at the annual Whisky Magazine’s World Whisky Awards (WWA) held in London in 2013.

References

South African brands
South African whisky
Economy of the Western Cape
Drakenstein